Diodora cayenensis, the Cayenne keyhole limpet, is a species of small to medium-sized sea snail or limpet, a western Atlantic marine prosobranch gastropod mollusk in the family Fissurellidae, the keyhole limpets.

This species is named after Cayenne, the capital of French Guiana. The spelling using one "n" is original and is therefore retained.

Distribution
The Cayenne keyhole limpet is found from New Jersey south through the West Indies to Brazil; in the Gulf of Mexico and in the Caribbean Sea; off the Canary Islands.

Shell description

This shell of this species varies from 15 mm to 50 mm in size and is shaped like a low cone with a small, subcentral keyhole-like opening or orifice on the top of the shell. The shell has an external sculpture of many radiating ribs. Internally, the keyhole opening is outlined by a truncate callus, which has a deep pit on its posterior edge.

The external coloration of the shell varies from white to pinkish gray or brown sometimes with faint rays, and the interior of the shell is white to gray.

This species of limpet lives in inlets and offshore waters attached to rocks or shells and is occasionally found washed up on sound and ocean beaches.

Life habits
The Cayenne keyhole limpet is a herbivore, and uses its radula to scrape algae from rocks. Its powerful foot creates strong suction to keep waves from washing it off the rocks.

Water for respiration and excretion is drawn in under the edge of the shell and exits through the "keyhole" near the peak.

The eggs of this species are yellow and are stuck to rocks. The young hatch and crawl away.

References

Keyhole Limpet and NC Sea Grant
Cayenne Keyhole Limpet
Diodora cayenensis
 Say, T. 1822. An account of some of the marine shells of the United States. Journal of the Academy of Natural Sciences of Philadelphia 2: 221-248, 257-276, 302-325.
 Reeve, L. 1850. Monograph of the genus Fissurella. Conchologia Iconica 6: pls. 9-16
 Turgeon, D.D., et al. 1998. Common and scientific names of aquatic invertebrates of the United States and Canada. American Fisheries Society Special Publication 26 page(s): 58
 Rosenberg, G., F. Moretzsohn, and E. F. García. 2009. Gastropoda (Mollusca) of the Gulf of Mexico, Pp. 579–699 in Felder, D.L. and D.K. Camp (eds.), Gulf of Mexico–Origins, Waters, and Biota. Biodiversity. Texas A&M Press, College Station, Texas
  Intergovernmental Oceanographic Commission (IOC) of UNESCO. The Ocean Biogeographic Information System (OBIS)

Fissurellidae
Gastropods described in 1822